Aliabad (also Romanized as ‘Alīābād; also known as ‘Alīābād-e Pīshkūh and ‘Ali Abad Pishkooh) is a village in Aliabad Rural District of the Central District of Taft County, Yazd province, Iran. At the 2006 National Census, its population was 959 in 314 households. The following census in 2011 counted 879 people in 299 households. The latest census in 2016 showed a population of 715 people in 254 households; it was the largest village in its rural district.

References 

Taft County

Populated places in Yazd Province

Populated places in Taft County